Tatiana Viktorovna Vidmer (née Bokareva, ; born 8 January 1986) is a Russian basketball power forward. She is a member of the Russian national team and played at the EuroBasket 2011 and at the 2010 World Championship, where she topped the steals, blocked shots and assists statistics. At the club level she won the EuroCup in 2013 and 2014 with Dynamo Moscow.

In 2009, she married Vsevolod Vidmer and changed her last name from Bokareva to Vidmer. Around January 2015 she gave birth to a son.

Her team Dynamo Kursk won the 2017 Euroleague, defeating in the final Turkish Fenerbahçe.

References

Russian women's basketball players
1986 births
Living people
European Games gold medalists for Russia
Basketball players at the 2015 European Games
European Games medalists in basketball
Power forwards (basketball)